NDN Collective is an indigenous-led activist and advocacy organization based in Rapid City, South Dakota, USA.  Founded in 2018, NDN Collective works with more than 200 Indigenous-led groups in the U.S. NDN Collective's mission is "Build the collective power of Indigenous Peoples, communities, and Nations to exercise our inherent right to self-determination, while fostering a world that is built on a foundation of justice and equity for all people and the planet." and includes “defend: our people, communities, and nations; develop: Indigenous communities in a regenerative and sustainable manner, and decolonize: our minds, communities, and sovereign nations.” According to president and CEO Nick Tilsen (Oglala Lakota), NDN Collective has “an overall strategy to shift power, decolonize wealth, and resource Indigenous people who are on the front lines of fighting for justice and equity.”

Campaigns 
The collective has four primary campaign areas:

 Climate justice
 Racial equity
 Education equity
 LANDBACK

The collective created its LANDBACK Campaign to support the global indigenous Land Back movement. The movement demands the return of Native American territory seized by breaking treaties, including return of Lakota territory in the Black Hills of South Dakota, where the four faces of Mount Rushmore are carved.  “Wherever you go to connect to God, that’s what the Black Hills are to the Lakota,” said Nick Tilsen, president of NDN Collective. The area, known as Paha Sapa — “the heart of everything that is” is sacred to the Lakota people.

Actions 
On July 3, 2020, Tilsen helped organize more than 200 people to attend, and was arrested at, a protest against the South Dakota's Mount Rushmore Fireworks Celebration 2020. Tilsen was charged with a combination of misdemeanors and felonies that could have led to 17 years in prison. Most charges were later dropped.

On July 4, 2021, 4 climbers were arrested after scaling a 100-foot-tall grain elevator in downtown Rapid City and hanging a gigantic, inverted American flag with the words "Land Back".

Funding 
NDN Collective in late 2021 was named a recipient of a Bush Foundation grant of $50 million. The organization has announced plans to redistribute these funds to indigenous individuals in North Dakota, South Dakota, and Minnesota

Prominent donors to NDN Collective include Mackenzie Scott, in 2021, due to her concerns about wealth inequality, discrimination, and the need for investment in education, and the Jeff Bezos Earth Fund, which in 2020 donated $12 million for their work against climate change.

Future plans 
NDN Collective plans to open an independent, Indigenous-led school for Native students in Rapid City, with 40 students in fall 2022. The school will be based upon the Native American Community Academy (NACA) and NACA-inspired schools network (NISN).

References

Further reading

External links 
 NDN Collective website 
 LANDBACK Campaign website
 Native American Community Academy (NACA)
 NACA-inspired schools network (NISN)

Advocacy groups in the United States
Indigenous rights